Clopton House is a 17th-century country mansion near Stratford upon Avon, Warwickshire, now converted into residential apartments. It is a Grade II* listed building.

The Manor of Clopton was granted to the eponymous family in the 13th century and in 1492 was owned by Hugh Clopton then Lord Mayor of London. In the late 16th century Joyce Clopton daughter of William Clopton (1538-1592), (a recusant Catholic), and heiress to the estate, married Sir George Carew (later Baron Carew and Earl of Totnes). They had no issue, and the estate fell to their nephew, Sir John Clopton. Thereafter the manor passed by marriage through the female line to the Partheriche, Boothby and Ingram families; the latter two changed their name to Clopton.

A manor house existing on the site in 1450 was owned by John Clopton, Alderman of the Trinity Guild of Coventry, and was rebuilt in the 16th century. The present house is a 17th-century creation by Sir John Clopton around the core of the 16th-century manor, with 19th-century extensions and improvements. The earliest part of the house on the north was substantially rebuilt in the 1840s. The south and east wings date from 1665 to 1670 in the Restoration style. The south front is two storied with attics and dormers. It has seven bays, the projecting central three being pedimented. The pediment over the entrance carries the Clopton family crest. The east wing is a similar but unpedimented seven bay range. The entrance porch bears an inscription FHH 1904.

The Cloptons sold the estate in 1824 to the Meynells, who sold it again in 1870 to George Lloyd of Welcombe House. His nephew Charles Thomas Warde (High Sheriff of Warwickshire  in 1846) carried out the significant extensions of the 1840s and also built the Grade II listed coachhouse and Clopton Tower, a Grade II listed belvedere in the grounds.

In 1872 the estate was acquired by Sir Arthur Hodgson, High Sheriff in 1881. On the death of his son Rev Francis H Hodgson (FHH) in 1930 the estate was broken up.

In 1605 Ambrose Rookwood, a Gunpowder Plot conspirator, lived in the house.

References

  Image and architectural description
  A History of the County of Warwick Vol 3 (1945)pp258-66 from British History Online

Grade II* listed buildings in Warwickshire
Country houses in Warwickshire
Folly castles in England
Grade II* listed houses